Dennis McCann is an English professional boxer.

Personal life
McCann was born to an English family his father, cousin and brother were boxers, with the latter being an amateur national champion.

Professional career

Early career
McCann made his professional debut against Kamil Jaworek on 18 May 2019. In the opening round, McCann landed a body shot which put his opponent on the canvas. Jaworek beat the count, however the bout was ended after McCann scored his second knockdown of the round moments later. On 13 July 2019, McCann fought for the second time as a professional when he came up against Jerson Larios. McCann won via points decision after dominating the entirety of the bout.

On 3 August 2019, McCann fought against Georgi Andonov. McCann won the bout via technical knockout within the opening minute of the first round. McCann faced Georgi Georgiev on 27 September 2019. In the opening round, McCann knocked his opponent down after landing a straight left hand. Georgiev managed to recover from the knockdown, however, McCann soon landed a flurry punches which scored the second knockdown of the bout. In the second round, McCann landed another heavy left hand which knocked Georgiev down for a third time. Despite Georgiev beating the count for a third time, the referee deemed him unable to carry on and waved off the bout.

McCann fought against Stefan Slavchev on 30 November 2019. During round two, he landed a clean right hand which forced Slavchev to retreat into a corner. McCann immediately started to pressure his opponent and landed a number of unanswered punches, after which the referee called an end to the bout in the second round. On 22 February 2020, McCann faced Pablo Narvaez. McCann cruised to a points win after winning every round on the scorecard.

Professional boxing record

References

External links

Year of birth missing (living people)
Date of birth missing (living people)
Living people
Sportspeople from Maidstone
British male boxers
Southpaw boxers
Super-bantamweight boxers
Featherweight boxers